Mohammed Animashaun popularly known as Moelogo
(born 13 April 1990) is a British–Nigerian singer-songwriter, he has songwriting credits for some notable music projects, including Tiwa Savage's Celia.

Early life
Moelogo was born in Lagos and he moved to London in 2001. He joined school choir at 14, discovering his talent and passion, he proceeded with London's Starlight Music Academy.

Career
In 2013, Moelogo released his debut EP Moe Is My Name, Music Is My Logo.

In 2016, he bagged a nomination for Best African Artist at Mobo Award,

In 2017, his contribution in Jonas Blue's single "We Could Go Back" as a featured artist scored him a UK Singles Chart entry. The single peaked at No. 74. It also charted in US Dance/Electronic Songs chart peaking at No. 34. It also charted in Belgium, Sweden and New Zealand.

In 2018, Moelogo signed publishing deal with Downtown Records.

Discography

EPs/Album
 Moe Is My Name, Music Is My Logo EP (2013)
 Ireti (2016)
Magic (2019)
Me (2020)
Myself (2020)

Selected singles
 "Penkele" (2016)
 "Rora Se" feat. Adekunle Gold (2016)
 "Penkele" Remix feat.Davido & Sarkodie (2016)
 "Happy" feat. Adekunle Gold (2018)

Collaboration

"Only Girl" – Adekunle Gold (2017)
 "We Could Go Back" – Jonas Blue (2017)
 "Education" - Tobinsco (2018)
 "Ohemaa" – M.anifest (2019)
 "Give You All" – King Lekan (2020)
 "Come Back" – Sarkodie (2021)

Award and Nominations
He has received many Accolades and Nominations,

References

Living people
Musicians from Lagos State
Nigerian male singer-songwriters
People from Lagos State
Yoruba musicians
21st-century Nigerian  male singers
1990 births